is a Japanese instructor of Shotokan karate.
 
She is currently an instructor of the Japan Karate Association.

Biography

Satomi Okuie was born in Aomori Prefecture, Japan on 21 March 1982. She studied at Komazawa University. Her karate training began during her Age 4.

Competition
Satomi Okuie has had considerable success in karate competition.

Major Tournament Success
53rd JKA All Japan Karate Championship (2010) - 3rd Place Women's Kumite
52nd JKA All Japan Karate Championship (2009) - 1st Place Women's Kumite
51st JKA All Japan Karate Championship (2008) - 1st Place Women's Kumite
50th JKA All Japan Karate Championship (2007) - 1st Place Women's Kumite
49th JKA All Japan Karate Championship (2006) - 3rd Place Women's Kumite
48th JKA All Japan Karate Championship (2005) - 1st Place Women's Kumite
9th Shoto World Cup Karate Championship Tournament (Tokyo, 2004) - 1st Place Women's Kumite
47th JKA All Japan Karate Championship (2004) - 3rd Place Women's Kumite
46th JKA All Japan Karate Championship (2003) - 2nd Place Women's Kumite
45th JKA All Japan Karate Championship (2002) - 3rd Place Women's Kumite
44th JKA All Japan Karate Championship (2001) - 3rd Place Women's Kumite
43rd JKA All Japan Karate Championship (2000) - 2nd Place Women's Kumite

References

 

1982 births
Japanese female karateka
Karate coaches
Shotokan practitioners
Sportspeople from Aomori Prefecture
Komazawa University alumni
Living people